Colchagua is a Chilean village located in Quillón, Diguillín Province, Ñuble Region. It is located close to the villages of Cerro Negro and Chancal.

References

Populated places in Diguillín Province